Sisir Kumar  may refer to

Sisir Kumar Das, Indian scholar
Sisir Kumar Ghosh, Indian journalist
Sisir Kumar Maitra, Indian academic
Sisir Kumar Mitra, Indian physicist
Sisir Kumar Saha, Indian politician